HBO Nederland (Home Box Office) was a Dutch premium television network, owned by a joint venture between HBO and the largest cable television operator in the Netherlands, Ziggo. It launched on 9 February 2012. HBO Nederland offered three television channels, available in HD and SD, video-on-demand services and HBO GO. The programming consisted of HBO's own productions, TV series, documentaries and films from Warner Bros.

HBO Netherlands closed on 31 December 2016. Cable company Ziggo has acquired the broadcasting licenses of HBO content for the Dutch market.

Channels
 HBO: Main flagship channel with television premieres
 HBO 2: Second channel with a focus on drama and comedy
 HBO 3: Third channel with a focus on action and thriller
 HBO On Demand
 HBO GO

See also
 HBO
 Television in the Netherlands

References

Netherlands
HBO Netherlands
Defunct television channels in the Netherlands
Television channels and stations established in 2012
Television channels and stations disestablished in 2016